The town of Two Buttes is a Statutory Town located in Baca County, Colorado, United States. The population was 43 at the 2010 census.

Geography
Two Buttes is located in northeast Baca County at  (37.561046, -102.397729).

Climate
The Köppen Climate system classifies the weather as semi-arid, abbreviated as BSk.

Demographics

As of the census of 2000, there were 67 people, 34 households, and 19 families residing in the town. The racial makeup of the town was 100.00% White. Hispanic or Latino of any race were 1.49% of the population.

There were 34 households, out of which 17.6% had children under the age of 18 living with them, 50.0% were married couples living together, 8.8% had a female householder with no husband present, and 41.2% were non-families. 41.2% of all households were made up of individuals, and 14.7% had someone living alone who was 65 years of age or older. The average household size was 1.97 and the average family size was 2.60.

In the town, the population was spread out, with 17.9% under the age of 18, 4.5% from 18 to 24, 16.4% from 25 to 44, 44.8% from 45 to 64, and 16.4% who were 65 years of age or older. The median age was 47 years. For every 100 females, there were 97.1 males. For every 100 females age 18 and over, there were 103.7 males.

The median income for a household in the town was $25,000, and the median income for a family was $33,750. Males had a median income of $26,875 versus $38,125 for females. The per capita income for the town was $16,856. There were 5.6% of families and 18.6% of the population living below the poverty line, including 100.0% of persons under the age of 18 and 20.0% of those over 64.

See also

Outline of Colorado
Index of Colorado-related articles
State of Colorado
Colorado cities and towns
Colorado municipalities
Colorado counties
Baca County, Colorado

References

External links

CDOT map of the Town of Two Buttes

Towns in Colorado
Towns in Baca County, Colorado